Frederick Noel Hamilton Wills of Miserden House, Gloucestershire,  was born in 1887. He is the youngest son of Sir Frederick Wills Bt. of Northmoor, Dulverton and Anne (née Hamilton). Sir Frederick Wills was a director of W D & H O Wills, a member of parliament and a staunch Liberal.  His wife, Anne, was the daughter of Rev. James Hamilton, a noted Scottish cleric.  The influence of both his parents and a close-knit family (two brothers, three sisters) was strong, as was the family home in Northmoor which inspired a passion for the English countryside.

Education
He was educated briefly at Winchester and then at Clifton College. At Magdalen College, Oxford, Noel Wills studied English. This provided the inspiration to realise an educational vision as the founder of Rendcomb College. His brother, Gilbert Wills (who became the first Lord Dulverton) and Canon Sewell (the first chair of governors) entertained the thought that 'if there had been no Magdalen, there would have been no Rendcomb'.  Noel Wills' time at Oxford was marked by wide-ranging reading, a generous appreciation of the talents of those around him and, in the words of Professor G S Gordon (who became president of the college), an 'unostentatious goodness'.

Sports
Wills also developed strong creative interests including painting, music (cellist and tenor), design, and writing. He also hunted, played polo, and fished. In 1909, he started a monthly magazine of poetry with Walter Jerrold, which included contributions from Walter de la Mare, Quiller-Couch, Lady Margaret Sackville and Edward Thomas.

A Scottish obituary (1927), records that he was the owner of the Invergarry Estate and Mansion. A slightly later report records that the estate was to be auctioned; it "only" extended to 160 acres but included the "whole of the angling in the Garry below the falls and in Loch Oich". This report refers to the House rather than a mansion; it could be referencing the current-day Invergarry Hotel.

Marriage and family
In 1912, Noel Wills married Margery Hamilton Fraser, the eldest daughter of Sir Hugh Fraser of Stromeferry House, Ross-shire.  Mrs Wills provided support, abiding encouragement and remained actively involved in Wills’ vision for the rest of her life.

Noel was a very wealthy man and had inherited a third of his late father's estate in 1909

His son MDH Wills was a captain in the Coldstream Guards at the time he was reported missing in Africa in July 1943 and was later confirmed dead. He is remembered on the MEDJEZ-EL-BAB MEMORIAL in Tunisa.

Purchase of Miserden Park Estate
Captain Wills purchased the Miserden Park Estate from Mr A W Leathham in 1913. The estate contained a fine.

Foundation of Rendcomb College
Noel Wills described himself as 'a dreamer', though his dreams were inspired by philosophical insight, sensitivity to others and a profound concern for the inequalities evident in the society in which he lived.  With the advantage of privilege, he felt the need to empower those less fortunate and in doing so showed a foresight borne out by huge changes to the education system in the first half of the century and the genesis of grammar school education.  In his words, 'When opportunity comes to the favoured few alone, how small an advance can be anticipated'. 
 
The Wills family was no stranger when it came to educational altruism; the founder's uncle and three of his cousins had founded and endowed buildings at Bristol University.  It was perhaps destined that Noel Wills would also make his mark on the world of education.  In 1918, the founder bought Rendcomb Park with a view to forming a 'Transition School' to provide a free boarding education to about forty boys from the elementary schools of Gloucestershire and prepare them for entry to Public School.  He envisaged that by giving them 'the best possible education, some would gain entry by scholarship to Public Schools and perhaps, a few, ultimately to University.  This initial vision was broad and generous, involving supplements from the endowment to subsidise scholarships and leaving scholarships for those who could not secure entry to Public Schools for 'assistance in beginning professions and trades'.  This vision evolved in the next two years in part by the Christmas gift that Mrs Wills had given her husband in 1917: An Adventure in Education by J H Simpson.

Simpson had been educated at Rugby School and Pembroke College, Cambridge, where he studied classics and history before teaching at Clifton College, Charterhouse School, Gresham's and Rugby.  The founder invited Simpson ('one of the men I most earnestly desire to consult') to Miserden in February 1919, and the conversation they had shaped the future of the vision.  Instead of providing what was essentially a preparatory school education, Rendcomb College would educate boys for five years to sixteen, or seven were the boys of University material. That Noel Wills was prepared to compromise his original intentions says much for his receptiveness to new ideas and the respect that he had for the educationalist; that Simpson was prepared to leave Rugby to take the founding Headship of Rendcomb rather than posts at Oundle or Leeds University says much for the respect that the educationalist had for the founder.  Simpson's attraction to Rendcomb would have been increased as he learnt more of the founder's intentions in a series of letters between the two in the months after their meeting (the founder being the excellent fisherman that he was!) outlining his intention to provide 'a social, moral and intellectual education rather than mere scholarship'. Simpson clearly saw the potential that such a brief provided.

On 2 June 1920, Rendcomb College opened with twelve boys, Simpson at the helm and Noel Wills as chair of governors.  The two men shaped the path of the school for a little over seven years, and their relationship was founded on mutual respect and affection.  In 1924, the founder wrote an illuminating piece for The English Review which gives a fascinating insight into those early years and his progressive educational vision.

‘Remembering what he wanted us to be – his pride in what has been done well, his indulgence for what has been done less well – we must go forward, humbly, but confidently, in the work of making his vision a reality.’
James Herbert Simpson, founding Headmaster of Rendcomb College

Death
Noel Wills died in Cheltenham in October 1927, aged 40, following an operation. His estate was valued at £5.053 million gross and £4.894 million net

References

The Collected Prose and Verse of Noel Wills (1931), collected by his wife, Margery Hamilton Wills and printed for private circulation.
A History of Rendcomb College (1976), compiled by C H C Osborne, J C James and K L James

External links 
Rendcomb is a Wills School (Rendcomb College) – released under the terms of the GNU Free Documentation License, Version 1.2 and later, and under the terms of the Creative Commons Attribute Share-Alike

1887 births
1927 deaths
Founders of English schools and colleges
People from Dulverton
Younger sons of baronets
Frederick Noel Hamilton